The Testament of Ba or the Chronicle of Ba(Tibetan  or ; Wylie transliteration:  or ) is a chronicle written in Classical Tibetan of the establishment of Mahayana Buddhism and Vajrayana Buddhism in Tibet, the foundation of the Samye Monastery, and includes notable events and people in Tibet's history and was written during the Tibetan Empire period. In 2008, early versions of the text were said to have been discovered in London, where two manuscript fragments possibly dating to the 9th or 10th centuries are held by the British Library.

Versions of the text 

The Testament of Ba was transmitted in manuscript form over many centuries, and so there are many different recensions of the text, but not one single, canonical printed version.  Two early versions of the text have been identified by scholars:

 A manuscript in 31 folios discovered in Lhasa in 1997, titled  (with a 'd' prefix to the Ba clan name), that is thought to be a revised copy of an 11th-century manuscript, and which was published in facsimile with an English translation in 2000;
 Three manuscripts titled  (with an 's' prefix to the Ba clan name), one of which dates to the 12th century, that were used as the basis of an edition published in Beijing in 1980.

The Testament of Ba is also widely quoted in later Tibetan historiographical works, for example the Scholar's Feast. The author of the Scholar's Feast calls the Testament the Rba bzhed (with an 'r' prefix to the Ba clan name), and refers to 'genuine', 'impure', 'large' and 'medium' versions of the text.

A later, expanded version of the Testament of Ba, titled  (Supplemented Testament of Ba), was produced during the mid 14th century. A manuscript copy of this text was published with a summary in French by Rolf Stein in 1961.

Up until 2009 it was thought that the Testament of Ba dated back to no earlier than the 11th or 12th century, and therefore its composition may not have been contemporaneous with the late 8th century events that it recorded.  However, in 2009 Sam van Schaik of the British Library realised that two Tibetan manuscript fragments catalogued amongst the Chinese manuscripts of the Stein collection (and consequently previously overlooked by Tibetan scholars) preserved a section of the Testament of Ba relating to the arrival of the Indian monk Śāntarakṣita, abbot of Nalanda University, to Lhasa:
  (six lines)
  (one line)

These two fragments came from the 'Library Cave' at Dunhuang, which was sealed in the early 11th century, and so pre-date all of the other known versions of the Testament of Ba. Van Schaik dates the fragments to the 9th or 10th centuries.

The text of the British Library fragments is very close to that of the  manuscript discovered in Lhasa in 1997, but has some differences that suggest that it represents an earlier recension of the Testament of Ba. Most notably, in the British Library fragments the king is concerned that the foreign monk may have brought evil spirits with him, and so Śāntarakṣita is confined in the Jokhang and interrogated for three months through an interpreter called Ananta. However, the Lhasa manuscript softens the language, politely asking Śāntarakṣita to stay at the Jokhang rather than having him forcibly confined there.

Bibliography 
 Stein, R. A. 1961.   (édition du texte tibétain et résumé français). Paris: Bibliothèque de l'Institut des Hautes Études chinoises, Textes et Documents.
 Wangdu, Pasang, and Diemberger, Hildegard. 2000. dBa' bzhed: The Royal Narrative concerning the bringing of the Buddha's Doctrine to Tibet. Vienna: Verlag der Österreichischen Akademie der Wissenschaften. .

See also 
 Old Tibetan Annals
 Old Tibetan Chronicle

References

External links 
 Transliteration of Or.8210/S.9498A
 Transliteration of Or.8210/S.13683 folio C

British Library oriental manuscripts
9th-century manuscripts
10th-century manuscripts
History of Tibet
Tibetan literature
Tibetan Buddhist treatises